Saleem Shehzad (born March 1946) is a Pakistani film, television, and radio singer. He is known for his song, "Piyar Ki Yaad Nigahon Mein Sajaye Rakhna", playback vocalized for the Urdu movie Talaash in 1976.

Early life and career
Shehzad was born in March 1945, in Ajmer, British India. His family migrated to Karachi, Pakistan after the partition in 1947. His father Azeem Prem Raagi was a poet who wanted his son to be a singer. Shehzad got his early music training from Ustaad Baray Ghulam Ali Khan who was residing in Lahore. 

Shehzad's career as a playback singer started with a song sung for the film, "Savera", released in 1959. In 1962, he won a film competition that was held to select singers for a movie, "Hum Ek Hein" in Lahore. His first song, "Onchay Onchay Mehalon Mein Dekho", was penned by Fayyaz Hashmi and composed by M. Ali Sharif. In 1964, he was offered a job at Radio Pakistan, Lahore, where he served for the next eighteen years and recorded over two thousand songs, ghazals, and Na'ats.

In 1964, the composer Sohail Rana picked Shehzad as a playback vocalist for his film, "Heera Aur Pathar". In the film, Shehzad sang a duet, along with Talat Siddiqui, "Mujhay Ik Larky Se Piyar Ho Gaya", that became a hit of the time. His other hit song, "Mohabbat Ke Diye Jala Lo", came from the movie, "Aslam o Alaikum" in 1969. In 1976, he recorded a song, "Piyar Ki Yaad Nigahon Mein Sajaye Rakhna", for the film "Talash", that later became his identity. His last movie as a playback singer was Moeen Akhtar's "Mr. K2", which was released in 1995.

Personal life
Shehzad lives in Karachi and gives music lessons to young singers at his home. In 2021, he almost lost his eye sight due to a mistreated ocular disease.

Notable songs
Shehzad sang 23 songs for 19 Urdu film:

References

1946 births
Living people
Pakistani playback singers
People from Ajmer
20th-century Pakistani male singers